Physocystidium is a genus of fungi in the family Tricholomataceae. This is a monotypic genus, containing the single species Physocystidium cinnamomeum. This species is found in Trinidad, and was  originally described as new to science in 1951 as Collybia cinnamomea by mycologist R.W.G. Dennis; Rolf Singer transferred it to the then newly created genus Physocystidium in 1962.

See also

 List of Tricholomataceae genera

References

Tricholomataceae
Monotypic Agaricales genera
Taxa named by Rolf Singer